Impire is a real-time strategy video game developed by Cyanide Studios and published by Paradox Interactive, and released for Microsoft Windows via Steam on February 14, 2013.

Gameplay
Initial press reactions to Impire drew comparisons with Bullfrog Productions's Dungeon Keeper, a real-time strategy game released in 1997 that received widespread critical acclaim. Alongside Dungeon Keeper, Impire similarly grants the player command over a subterranean empire, with the ability to construct buildings, recruit monsters, and engage minions in combat.

Setting
Within the fictional universe of Impire, the player assumes the persona of Baʿal-Abaddon, a primordial evil summoned from Tartarus and imprisoned in the physical form of a demonic imp, initially forced to serve the incompetent sorcerer Oscar van Fairweather. During the course of Impire, Baal-Abaddon escapes van Fairweather's control and attempts to reconstruct his ancient, nefarious empire under the continent of Ardania.

Development
Shortly after announcing the project on July 26, 2012, Yves Bordeleau, the Studio Director of Cyanide Montreal indicated that Impire was in 'pre-pre-alpha' during his presentation to GameSpot staff. Throughout Bordeleau's demonstration, he frequently referenced the 'scenarios' in the single-player and co-operative campaign setting of Impire, suggesting that the structure of the game is predominantly mission-based.

Reception

Impire received "unfavorable" reviews according to the review aggregation website Metacritic.

References

External links
 

2013 video games
Cyanide (company) games
Dungeon management games
Paradox Interactive games
Strategy video games
Video games developed in France
Windows games
Windows-only games